Daniel V. McCaughan OBE is an electronic engineer, executive and researcher.

McCaughan was born in Belfast where he attended St. Mary's Christian Brothers' Grammar School, Belfast. He proceeded to Queen's University Belfast from which he obtained a BSc (Hons) followed by PhD in physics. In 1992, he was awarded a D.Sc. He is a Chartered Engineer and a Chartered Physicist.
 
He then worked in a number of electronic engineering businesses conducting research. He was a member of technical staff at Bell Telephone Laboratories from 1968 to 1974 and then became a Senior Principal in the UK Ministry of Defence developing silicon technology. In the 1980s he moved to GEC Marconi and in the 1990s became Chief Scientist in Nortel Technology. McCaughan has been awarded over 20 patents. He has published over 100 academic papers and book chapters on both technical and managerial subjects.

He is a Professorial Fellow at Queen's University Belfast.

Awards
 OBE, for contribution to technology
 Fellow, Institute of Physics
 Fellow of the Institution of Engineering and Technology
 Fellow, Institution of Engineers of Ireland
 Fellow, Royal Aeronautical Society
 Fellow of the Royal Academy of Engineering
 Fellow, Irish Academy of Engineering

References

People educated at St. Mary's Christian Brothers' Grammar School, Belfast
Alumni of Queen's University Belfast
Fellows of the Royal Academy of Engineering
20th-century Irish engineers
Fellows of the Institution of Engineering and Technology
Living people
Year of birth missing (living people)